Fort Cherry School District is a small, rural public school district located in southwestern Pennsylvania. It covers a portion of suburban Pittsburgh and some outlying rural areas. The district serves students in a  area that includes the suburban boroughs of McDonald and Midway and the village of Hickory, as well as the predemoinantly rural townships of Robinson and Mount Pleasant.  According to a 2008 local census, it serves a resident population of 8,878.  The residents' per capita income was $17,963, while median family income was $45,688.

History
The Fort Cherry School District was established in 1954, bringing together the schools of McDonald, Midway, Mount Pleasant Township, and Robinson Township.

Schools
Fort Cherry Elementary Center
Fort Cherry Junior-Senior High School

Notable alumni
James Garry, Fort Cherry Rangers football coach (1958-2002); inducted into the Pennsylvania Scholastic Football Hall of Fame (1994) 
Marvin Lewis, former head coach of the Cincinnati Bengals
Marty Schottenheimer, former NFL coach
Kurt Schottenheimer, former NFL coach. Most recently a secondary coach with the Green Bay Packers in 2008

References

External links
Fort Cherry School District

School districts established in 1954
School districts in Washington County, Pennsylvania
School districts in Allegheny County, Pennsylvania
1954 establishments in Pennsylvania